Punta del Diablo is a village and seaside locality in Uruguay, Rocha Department,  east from the capital Montevideo. According to the 2011 census, its permanent population consisted of 823 inhabitants, mostly fishermen and artisans, while during high tourism season, the population swells to approximately 25,000, mostly with Argentinians, Brazilians and Europeans on holiday. As with the country it is located in, the primary language spoken in Punta del Diablo is Spanish.
In 2008 it was named by the magazine "Lonely Planet" as one of the top 20 places to visit and invest.

Population
In 2011 Punta del Diablo had a population of 823.

Source: Instituto Nacional de Estadística de Uruguay

Geography

Punta Del Diablo is perched on a gentle rise overlooking the ocean and centered around a square of brightly colored buildings, including houses, shops, restaurants, bars, shops and grocery stores that line sandy lanes.

Due to strict building codes, there are no high rises or sprawling luxury resorts or high rises. Instead there are small hotels, a boutique hostel, cabanas and vacation houses.

The white sands of the beach below are separated by the main rocky point, "Punta Del Diablo," which extends more than 600 feet, and two other rocky points, together forming "The Trident."

Climate
Punta del Diablo is in the Southern Hemisphere's temperate zone and has four seasons. Temperatures average 21 °C to 27 °C (70 °F to 80 °F) in summer and 10 °C and 16 °C (50 °F to 60 °F) in winter.

Tourism
The high season for tourism runs from December through February, as well as through Easter week. During high season, the population of the small fishing and artisan village of approximately 400 people, grows to approximately 25,000.

Tourists rent homes and cabanas or stay in hostels and small hotels. Most of the hotels and hostels are open only during the high season; however, some are open year-round to accommodate the increasing number of visitors to the seaside village. In response several restaurants including fine-dining options are also open off-season.

In 2008, Lonely Planet ranked Punta del Diablo among the top 10 cities to visit.
During that year, tourism was up to about 20,000 visitors during the December to February seasonal peak.

Punta del Diablo's popularity with holidaymakers has steadily increased. And the single farming family that has owned the entirety of Punta del Diablo has been steadily selling land to investors.

This tourism growth and Uruguay's positive investment climate and rule of law are attractive to foreign investors. Foreign investors are treated the same as national investors, prior authorization is not required, and they enjoy fully free remittance of capital and profits. Uruguay itself is host to about 100 American firms with investments totaling approximately $656 million; and the small village of Punta del Diablo has attracted a steady stream of American and other foreign investors.

Places of interest
 Beaches - The picturesque, white sand beaches are a major attraction here and include: Los Botes, called "Fisherman’s Beach" and from which most of the boats depart; Rivero, which in the high season is lined with open bars and popular with surfers; and La Viuda, also popular with surfers and where locals and visitors are often seen in the summer gathered around beachfires playing guitars and singing songs.
 Parque Nacional Santa Teresa (Saint Teresa National Park) - This coastal National Park is about 5 km from Punta del Diablo. The 3,000 hectares is home to approximately 2 million trees, as well as flora and fauna from around the world (including rare cormorants); it is the site of one of Uruguay's major battles for its independence. The park has 60 km of hiking trails. Sand dunes may be found on the beaches. Whales can be seen along the shore during Uruguay's summer.
 Fortaleza de Santa Teresa(Fortress of Santa Teresa) - A significant historical site in Uruguay, the fortress sits on top of a hill inside Saint Teresa National Park. The Portuguese began building the hilltop fort in 1762 and worked on it until the Spanish captured it in 1793. It was built in a disputed territory between the two empires that now form one of the oldest borders in the American continent. Its location between the Atlantic Ocean and the Laguna Negra with the bañados (wetlands) in the other side of the lagoon made it a strategic point for any army coming from Brazil to achieve the ancient dream of the "natural borders of Brazil" on the River Plate. Fortaleza de Santa Teresa was also part of later battles between the two empires, as well as the Spanish and Creoles, and in civil wars after Uruguay became an independent nation. The fortress was restored in 1928 and features a museum that illustrates its history. The fortress is also depicted in the shield in the center of Rocha's municipal flag and on the Department's municipal shield, becoming a symbol of this border department with Brazil.
 Laguna Negra formerly known as Laguna de los Difuntos - Boaters and birdwatchers enjoy this lake and its swamps, has an area of 182 km2. (70 sq. miles), maximum depth of 5 mt. (16 feet).
 Bosque de Ombúes (Ombu Forest) - The native Ombu that populate this forest is a hardy tree that survives on very little water. Jeep and tractor tours are offered, and visitors may also view the forest on foot. The forest includes flora and fauna endemic to the region.
 Centro de Tortugas Marinas (Center for Sea Turtles) - This is located near a popular foraging site for sea turtles, the waters off the beaches of Barra del Chuy to Punta del Diablo. The Center educates visitors and runs a volunteer program.

Activities
Horseback Riding. Year round, visitors can rent horse or take guided horseback riding tours on the beach or in the forest.

Dune boarding. Similar to snow boarding only done on the sand dunes. The surf shop in Punta del Diablo sells dune boards. Popular locations in Punta del Diablo for sand duning include the south end of La Viuda beach.

Surfing. The surf breaks off Punta Diablo's beaches offer relatively consistent and uncrowded surf. Best conditions are in the autumn and winter with high season running from December to February. Visitors can rent or purchase surf boards at the Surf Shop on, Main Road.

Transport
It is about an hour's walk from one end of the town to another. There is a regular bus service that transports people from the main village road to the beach. There is a taxi, which often parks at the bus stop.

Punta del Diablo has regular bus service to Chuy (bordering Brazil), Rocha and Montevideo. During the summer, there is service to the seaside towns of La Paloma, La Piedra, and Punta del Este. During the high season of tourism, January, all bus seats are sometimes booked days in advance.

Car rentals are found in Montevideo.

Going into Punta del Diablo, some of the buses go into town and others drop off passengers about 5 km from town at a square from which dirt roads fan out to various parts of the village. It is about a 3 ½ bus ride from Montevideo.

References

External links

All About Punta del Diablo and accommodation info
About Punta del Diablo including some history
Accommodation in Punta del Diablo
Visitor Assistance, Translation
Punta del Diablo Maps
Photos of Punta del Diablo
INE map of Punta del Diablo
Punta del Diablo Blog

Populated places in the Rocha Department
Seaside resorts in Uruguay